Vlastibor Klimeš (24 May 1924 – 11 February 2009) was a Czech architect. His work was part of the architecture event in the art competition at the 1948 Summer Olympics.

References

1924 births
2009 deaths
20th-century Czech architects
Olympic competitors in art competitions
People from Hradec Králové